Parliamentary elections were held in Cuba on 15 March 1942. The Liberal Party and the Democratic Party both won 21 seats in the House of Representatives.

Results

References

Cuba
Parliamentary elections in Cuba
Parliamentary election
Cuban parliamentary election
Election and referendum articles with incomplete results